Judson Toll Jennings (September 24, 1872 – February 8, 1948) was an American librarian. Jennings served as the Director of the Seattle Public Library from 1907 to 1942. Upon retirement, Jennings became the first chair of a new King County Rural Library District, the predecessor to the modern-day King County Library System.

He was president of the American Library Association from 1923 to 1924.

Bibliography
 Bibliography of New York Colonial History (1901)
 With the ALA Service Overseas Bulletin of the American Library Association, Volume 13 (July 1, 1919)
 Library Recruiting Bulletin of the American Library Association, Volume 16 (July 1, 1922)
 Voluntary education through the public library American Library Association (1929)
 A program for library development in the state of Washington Washington Library Association (December, 1934)

References

 

1872 births
1948 deaths
American librarians
Presidents of the American Library Association